Supranational elections held in 2017.

February
19 February: Andean Parliament, Ecuador

November
26 November: Central American Parliament, Honduras

References

2017 elections
Supranational elections
2017
Political timelines of the 2010s by year